Irmgard is a feminine German given name. Notable people with the name include:

 Irmgard of Berg (fl. 12th century), German noble, daughter of Adolf VI, Count of Berg
 Irmgard of Chiemsee (c. 831/833 – 16 July 866)
 Irmgard of Cleves (c. 1307–1362), German noble,  wife of John IV, Lord of Arkel
 Saint Irmgardis or Irmgard (1000–1065 or 1082/1089)
 Irmgard Bartenieff (1900–1981), German dance theorist, dancer, choreographer and physical therapist 
 Irmgard Bensusan (born 1991), South African paralympic sprinter
 Irmgard Brendenal-Böhmer, German rower 
 Irmgard Enderle (1895–1985), German politician, trade unionist and journalist
 Irmgard Farden Aluli (1911–2001), Hawaiian composer
 Irmgard Flügge-Lotz (1903–1974), German-American mathematician, aerospace engineer, and control theorist
 Irmgard Fuest (1903–1980), German lawyer and politician
 Irmgard Griss (born 1946), Austrian lawyer and judge, former President of the Supreme Court of Justice
 Irmgard Hermann (1942–2020), German actress 
 Irmgard Huber (1901–1983), German head nurse of the Hadamar Clinic during the Nazi era
 Irmgard Kärner (1927–2014), German chess player
 Irmgard Keun (1905–1982), German novelist
 Irmgard Krauser (born 1948), German gymnast 
 Irmgard Lanthaler, Italian luger 
 Irmgard Latz (born 1939), German badminton player 
 Irmgard Litten (1879–1953), German writer
 Irmgard Lukasser (born 1954), Austrian alpine skier
 Irmgard Möller (born 1947), former member of the German terrorist group the Red Army Faction (RAF) 
 Irmgard Neumann (1925–1989), East German politician
 Irmgard Oepen (1929–2018) German physician and writer
 Irmgard Praetz (1920–2008), German track and field athlete
 Irmgard Riessen (born 1944), German actress
 Irmgard Sames (born 1914), German long track speed skater
 Irmgard Schmelzer (1921–2002), German track and field athlete
 Irmgard Schwaetzer (born 1942), German politician and Protestant church official
 Irmgard Seefried (1919–1988), German soprano  
 Irmgard Sörensen-Popitz (1896–1993), German graphic designer
 Irmgard Trojer (born 1964), Italian track and field athlete

See also
 591 Irmgard, a minor planet
 Ermengarde (disambiguation)

German feminine given names